

Johann-Heinrich Eckhardt (3 December 1896 – 15 May 1945) was a German general in the Wehrmacht during World War II. He was a recipient of the Knight's Cross of the Iron Cross with Oak Leaves of Nazi Germany. Eckhardt surrendered to the American troops on 8 May 1945 and died in custody on 15 May 1945.

Awards and decorations
 Iron Cross (1914) 2nd Class (20 October 1915) & 1st Class (2 March 1917)
 Clasp to the Iron Cross (1939) 2nd Class (17 October 1939) & 1st Class (29 May 1940)
 German Cross in Gold on 25 January 1942 as Oberst in Jäger-Regiment 38
 Knight's Cross of the Iron Cross with Oak Leaves
 Knight's Cross on 20 May 1942 as Oberst and commander of Jäger-Regiment 38
 644th Oak Leaves on 3 November 1944 as Generalleutnant and commander of 211. Infanterie-Division

References

Citations

Bibliography

 
 
 

1896 births
1945 deaths
People from Schwalm-Eder-Kreis
Lieutenant generals of the German Army (Wehrmacht)
German Army personnel of World War I
Recipients of the Gold German Cross
Recipients of the Knight's Cross of the Iron Cross with Oak Leaves
German prisoners of war in World War II held by the United States
German people who died in prison custody
Prisoners who died in United States military detention
People from Hesse-Nassau
Recipients of the clasp to the Iron Cross, 1st class
20th-century Freikorps personnel
Military personnel from Hesse